Dr Edgar David Villanueva  Núñez is a politician and congressman in the Republic of Peru. He is best known for introducing a bill to mandate use of free software in public agencies. The introduction of the Bill 1609 invited the attention of Microsoft,
to whose letter Dr Villanueva wrote a famous reply.

A bill that mandates consideration of open source software was passed into law in October 2005.

Both the Bill and Dr Villanueva's letter have been widely cited by pro-active governments and Free Software activists as a convincing rationale behind the introduction of Free Software in Governments.

See also 
 Free software movement

References

External links 
 Use of Free Software in Public Agencies
  Official homepage

Copyright activists
Living people
Members of the Congress of the Republic of Peru
Year of birth missing (living people)